ONE 157: Petchmorakot vs. Vienot was a Combat sport event produced by ONE Championship that took place on May 20, 2022, at the Singapore Indoor Stadium in Kallang, Singapore.

Background
A ONE Featherweight Muay Thai World Championship bout between current champion Petchmorakot Petchyindee and Jimmy Vienot headlined the event.

A ONE Strawweight Muay Thai World Championship bout between the champion Prajanchai P.K.Saenchai and title challenger Joseph Lasiri was expected to take place at ONE: Lights Out but it was postponed due to Lasiri getting injury during his training camp. They met at this event instead scheduled as the co-main event.

The quarterfinal bouts of the ONE Flyweight Muay Thai World Grand Prix Tournament will be held during the event.

A ONE Flyweight Muay Thai Grand Prix bout between current ONE Flyweight Muay Thai Champion Rodtang Jitmuangnon and Jacob Smith was expected to take place at ONE on TNT 1 in last April, but Smith withdraw from the bout due to injury. The pairing was rebooked for this event.

Two lightweight submission grappling matches were announced for the event: between former Featherweight title Challenger Garry Tonon and Tye Ruotolo, as well as between Former 2-time ONE Lightweight Champions Shinya Aoki and Kade Ruotolo.

A Heavyweight Kickboxing bout, Rade Opačić and Guto Inocente was scheduled for the event. However, the bout was pushed back to ONE 158 for Inocente tested positive for COVID-19.

A heavyweight bout between Marcus Almeida and Oumar Kane was scheduled for ONE 156. However, the bout was moved to this event due to Oumar Kane injury and was replaced by Hugo Cunha. However, Cunha tested positive for COVID-19 before the event and was replaced by Jasur Mirzamukhamedov. However, Mirzamukhamedov tested positive for COVID-19 After traveling to Singapore. the bout will be rescheduled for Buchecha and expected to return to action at ONE 158.

A Women's Atomweight bout between Alyse Anderson and Asha Roka was scheduled for ONE X. However, Anderson withdraw from the bout due to medical resons. The pairing was rebooked for this event.

Jonathan Haggerty was set to face Walter Goncalves in the quarter-finals of the ONE Flyweight Muay Thai World Grand Prix. However, Haggerty was forced to pull out of his bout at the last minute due to health issue and was replaced by Josue Cruz, who had been set to compete in a Grand Prix alternate bout against Panpayak Jitmuangnon earlier in the card.

Results

Bonus awards
The following fighters received $50,000 bonuses.

 Performance of the Night: Petchmorakot Petchyindee, Joseph Lasiri, Rodtang Jitmuangnon and Tye Ruotolo

See also 

 2022 in ONE Championship
 List of ONE Championship events
 List of current ONE fighters

References 

Events in Singapore
ONE Championship events
2022 in mixed martial arts
Mixed martial arts in Singapore
Sports competitions in Singapore
May 2022 sports events in Singapore